Hybrid investments, also known as derivatives or just hybrids, are a form of investment that combines equity and debt-like features, allowing companies to protect themselves against financial risks in securities transactions. This form of investment is essential for traders and investment professionals to diversify their asset portfolio. Hybrid Investments work to maintain a sense of security for both the business and the investor.

Types of Hybrid Investments

The two most popular types of Hybrid Investments are Preferred Stock and Convertible Bonds.

Preferred Stocks – Stockholders receive dividend payments on a regular basis and gain funds when share values rise on security exchanges.

Convertible Bonds – Bondholders periodically receive interest payments. An exchange of bonds for a specified number of equity shares is acceptable, but only in accordance with the convertible bond covenant.

Investors buying these products look to accumulate periodic fixed-interest payments and profit when share prices rise in financial markets. New types of Hybrid Investments are constantly being introduced to meet the needs of professional investors.

References

Investment